In differential geometry, the exponential map is a generalization of the ordinary exponential function of mathematical analysis. Important special cases include:
 exponential map (Riemannian geometry) for a manifold with a Riemannian metric,
 exponential map (Lie theory) from a Lie algebra to a Lie group,
 More generally, in a manifold with an affine connection, where  is a geodesic with initial velocity X, is sometimes also called the exponential map. The above two are special cases of this with respect to appropriate affine connections.
 Euler's formula forming the unit circle in the complex plane.